Martin Madden may refer to:

 Martin B. Madden (1855–1928), U.S. Representative from Illinois
 Martin Madden (ice hockey), Canadian former ice hockey general manager

See also
 Martin Maddan (1920–1973), British politician
 Martin Madan (1726–1790), English barrister, clergyman and writer
 Martin Madan (politician) (1700–1756), groom of the bedchamber to Frederick, Prince of Wales